Shayampet is a village and a mandal in Hanamkonda district in the state of Telangana in India.

 List of Villages in Shyampet Mandal
1. Gatlakaniparthy 

2. Hussainpalle 

3. Katrapalle 

4. Koppula 

5. Mylaram 

6. Neredpalle 

7. Pattipaka 

8. Pedda Kodepaka

9. Shayampet 

10.Pragathi Singaram 

11. Taharapur 

12. Vasanthapur .

References 
 villageinfo.in

Villages in Hanamkonda district
Mandals in Hanamkonda district